Tornillo is the sixth album by American country music band Whiskey Myers. It was released on July 29, 2022, via Wiggy Thump Records with distribution by Thirty Tigers. The first two songs, "Tornillo" and "John Wayne" were released on February 18, 2022.

Content
Singer Cody Cannon wrote or co-wrote nine of the twelve songs on Tornillo, with the others being credited to guitarist John Jeffers. Cannon stated that the album is "going to have a little bit different sound" and "it's still Whiskey Myers at its core, but it's kind of fresh... We did a lot of bass and horns on this one, which is something we’ve always wanted to do."

Track listing

Charts

References

2022 albums
Whiskey Myers albums